The 2019–20 UNC Wilmington Seahawks men's basketball team represents the University of North Carolina at Wilmington during the 2019–20 NCAA Division I men's basketball season. The Seahawks are led by interim head coach Rob Burke who took over for C. B. McGrath after an 0–6 start to conference play.  They play their home games at Trask Coliseum as members of the Colonial Athletic Association.

Point guard Kai Toews left the team in December to pursue professional opportunities.

Previous season
The Seahawks finished the 2018–19 season 10–23, 5–13 in CAA play to finish in last place. They defeated Elon in the quarterfinals of the CAA tournament before losing in the semifinals to Northeastern.

Offseason

Departures

Incoming transfers

2019 recruiting class

2020 recruiting class

Roster

Schedule and results

|-
!colspan=9 style=| Non-conference regular season
|-

|-
!colspan=9 style=| CAA regular season

|-
!colspan=9 style=| CAA tournament

Source:

References

UNC Wilmington Seahawks men's basketball seasons
UNC Wilmington
UNC Wilmington
UNC Wilmington